Dawn of the Monsters is a beat'em up video game developed by 13AM Games and published by WayForward. The game was released in March 2022 for Windows, Nintendo Switch, PlayStation 4, PlayStation 5, Xbox One, Xbox Series X/S, and Google Stadia. The game received generally positive reviews upon release.

Premise
The game begins in 2036, when enormous monsters known as the Nephilim invade Earth and cause massive destruction around the globe. Three decades later, humanity establishes the Defense Alliance Worldwide Network (DAWN), and recruits the help of four different guardian creatures (Megadon, Ganira, Aegis Prime, and Tempest Galahad) in an attempt to retake the planet from these beasts.

Gameplay
Dawn of the Monsters is a 2.5D side-scrolling beat'em up video game similar to Streets of Rage and Final Fight, though the game also has features commonly found in fighting games. The player assumes control of one of four guardian creatures, and combats other enormous monsters. Each of these characters has their own unique attacks and finishing moves. As the guardian monster attacks their opponents and destroys buildings, its Rage meter will build up slowly, allowing it to unleash special moves known as Rage attacks. The player character can further unleash Cataclysm Attacks, which deal devastating damages to their opponents. Players can also use environment hazards to deal additional damage to enemies. As the player progresses in the game, they will unlock augments, which can be used to modify the monster's combat abilities. The player's performance will be rated at the end of each stage. The game's campaign features 35 different levels and takes place in four major locations (Toronto, Foz do Iguaçu, Cairo, and Tokyo). In addition to the single-player, the game also supports two-player local cooperative multiplayer.

Development
Dawn of the Monsters was developed by Canadian game studio 13AM Games. The team first had the idea of making a kaiju game in early 2016, though no publisher was willing to fund the title and the team shifted their attention to make Double Cross. Following the release of that game in 2019, 13AM developed a prototype of Dawn of the Monsters, and successfully pitched the game to WayForward at E3. WayForward announced the partnership with 13AM Games in October 2020. Originally set to be released in late 2021, the game was delayed and subsequently released digitally for Windows, Nintendo Switch, PlayStation 4, PlayStation 5, Xbox One and Xbox Series X and Series S on March 15, 2022. Limited Run Games will release a physical edition of the game.

The game's artstyle was inspired by comic books. It was designed to be "striking" and "evocative" of imagery from kaiju movie posters. Director Alex Rushdy described the art style as a mashup of Japanese manga and the works of Mike Mignola, the creator of Hellboy. To ensure that the team had a consistent vision of the game's tone, Rushdy organised movie nights in which the team would watch movies such as Godzilla (1954) and Gamera. The team also invited numerous artists to collaborate on the game. Shinji Nishikawa, who was involved in the design of several Godzilla films, helped the team design a boss character, while Yuji Kaida, who served as an illustrator on multiple kaiju projects, designed the cover for the game's physical edition. E. J. Su and Zander Cannon were involved in the production of the game's promotional materials, with Su creating the game's key art. Powerhouse Animation Studios created the game's animated opening sequence.

Reception 

Dawn of the Monsters received "generally favorable" reviews according to review aggregator Metacritic.

Stuart Gipp from Nintendo Life praised the extensive customization options and augments, which added variations to the game. However, he was disappointed by the repetitive stage design, and the stiff animation. Writing for Destructoid, Chris Moyse strongly commended the game's visuals and described it as "dazzling" and "one of the finest 2D releases in years". While he enjoyed the combat system for its depth and complexity, he believed that the game failed to present enough challenges to players. Shaun Musgrave from TouchArcade agreed that the game slowly became repetitive, though he recommended the game for its solid gameplay mechanics and its premise. He concluded his review by writing "fans of either beat-em-ups or giant monsters will want to grab this game sharpish and get to smashing and demolishing the enemy forces".

References

External links
 

2022 video games
Action video games
Beat 'em ups
Kaiju video games
Nintendo Switch games
PlayStation 4 games
PlayStation 5 games
Side-scrolling beat 'em ups
Stadia games
Tokusatsu video games
Video games developed in Canada
Video games set in Egypt
Video games set in Canada
Video games set in Japan
Video games set in Brazil
Video games with 2.5D graphics
WayForward games
Windows games
Indie video games
Xbox One games
Xbox Series X and Series S games
Multiplayer and single-player video games